Róbert Gulya (born 10 November 1973) is a Hungarian-British composer. He composes contemporary classical music as well as film scores.

Life 
Robert Gulya studied at the Franz Liszt Academy of Music in Budapest, the University of Music and Performing Arts, Vienna and attended a film scoring advanced program at the University of California, Los Angeles. His scores are published by Swiss music publisher Éditions BIM. Inter alia, he created several works for the Austrian guitarist Johanna Beisteiner, such as a Concert for guitar and orchestra, which was performed with the Budapest Symphony Orchestra. Robert Gulya is the owner of the film music production company Interscore LTD.

Honours and awards
2014: Cannes Corporate Media & TV Award Winner: Best Music for Where the World Unfolds.
2008: Action On Film International Film Festival, USA: Best Score Feature for the film score of Atom Nine Adventures (USA 2007, director: Christopher Farley)
1997: Third Prize at the International Composer’s Competition In Memoriam Zoltán Kodály, Budapest (Hungary)
1996: Albert Szirmai Prize, Budapest (Hungary)
1995: First Prize at the International Summer Academy Prague-Vienna-Budapest (Austria)

List of works (incomplete)

Classical works
1995: Burlesque for tuba and piano
1996: Memory of a lost world - a tale of the legendary Atlantis  for orchestra and choir
1997: Concert for piano and orchestra No. 1
2000: Fairy Dance for guitar solo
2000: Concert for tuba and orchestra
2001: Dolphin’ s voice for piano
2005: Moods for brass quintet
2006: Capriccio for guitar and piano
2007: Night Sky Preludes for guitar solo
2008: The Milonguero and the Muse (Tango), first version for guitar and string orchestra (music to the video clip of the same name)
2009: Concert for guitar and orchestra. Sample of first movement performed live in 2009 by Johanna Beisteiner and the Budapest Symphony Orchestra conducted by Béla Drahos (Video published in 2010 by Gramy Records)
2009: The Milonguero and the Muse (Tango), second version for flute, guitar and string orchestra. Sample of this tango performed live in 2009 by Béla Drahos, Johanna Beisteiner and the Budapest Symphony Orchestra (Video published in 2010 by Gramy Records)
2010: Waltz for guitar solo
2013: Nutcracker Variations for guitar and string orchestra

Film scores 
Truce (USA 2004, director: Matthew Marconi)
The Boy Who Cried (USA 2005, director: Matt Levin)
S.O.S. Love! (HU 2007, Director: Tamás Sas)
Atom Nine Adventures (USA 2007, director: Christopher Farley)
9 and a half dates (HU 2007, director: Tamás Sas)
Themoleris (HU 2007, director: Balázs Hatvani)
Bamboo Shark (USA 2008; director: Dennis Ward)
Outpost (USA 2008; director: Dominick Domingo)
Made in Hungaria (HU 2008, director: Gergely Fonyo)
Illusions (HU 2009, director: Zsolt Bernáth)
Night of Singles (HU 2010, director: Tamás Sas)
Truly Father (HU 2010, director: Emil Novák)
Thelomeris (HU 2011, director: Balázs Hatvani). Sample of the opening theme City of Time
In the name of Sherlock Holmes (HU 2012, director: Zsolt Bernáth)Gingerclown (Hu 2013, director: Balázs Hatvani)Tom Sawyer & Huckleberry Finn (USA 2014, director: Jo Kastner)Aura (HU 2014, director: Zsolt Bernath)What Ever Happened to Timi (HU 2014, director: Attila Herczeg)

 Discography (incomplete)
List of albums containing works by Robert Gulya:

CD
 1997: Winners of the First International Composers Competition (Kodály Foundation, CD BR 0156, Budapest, Hungary): album including Piano concerto No. 1 by Gulya
 2001: Johanna Beisteiner - Dance Fantasy: album including Fairy Dance for guitar solo by Gulya
 2004: Johanna Beisteiner - Between present and past: album including Capriccio for guitar and piano by Gulya
 2007: Atom Nine Adventures (Original Motion Picture Soundtrack), Samples on the website of Moviescore Media2007: S.O.S. Love (Original Motion Picture Soundtrack)

DVD
 2010: Johanna Beisteiner - Live in Budapest: album of a live performance with the Budapest Symphony Orchestra conducted by Béla Drahos including the world premiere of the Concert for guitar and orchestra and the Tango The Milongaro and the Muse by Gulya

Samples
Robert Gulya: Concerto for guitar and orchestra (first movement performed live by Johanna Beisteiner and the Budapest Symphony Orchestra conducted by Béla Drahos (Video, Gramy Records, 2010)
Robert Gulya: Tango The Milonguero and the Muse for flute, guitar and string orchestra performed live in 2009 by Béla Drahos, Johanna Beisteiner and the Budapest Symphony Orchestra (Video, Gramy Records, 2010)
 Robert Gulya: Atom Nine Adventures (Original Motion Picture Soundtrack on the website of Moviescore Media, 2007)

 References 

 External links 
"Róbert Gulya" Official website of Robert Gulya
List of works by Robert Gulya on the official website of Johanna Beisteiner

Official website of Swiss music publisher Éditions BIM with scores of works by Robert Gulya
Discography of albums by the Austrian classical guitarist Johanna Beisteiner including recordings of works by Robert Gulya on the official website of Gramy Records
Gulya Róbert Biography of Robert Gulya on the website of Filmzene.net (Hungarian, 2012)
Müvek bontakozóban - Gulya Róbert gitáros korszaka. Interview with Robert Gulya about his Concert for guitar and orchestra. Muzsika''. August 2004. (Hungarian)

1973 births
Living people
Hungarian classical composers
Hungarian male classical composers
Composers for the classical guitar
Hungarian film score composers
Male film score composers
Contemporary classical music performers
21st-century classical composers
20th-century classical composers
20th-century Hungarian male musicians
21st-century Hungarian male musicians